The African Beat is a jazz album released by Art Blakey and The Afro-Drum Ensemble in November 1962 on Blue Note Records. He described it as the first opportunity he had to work with drummers from Africa; as a blend of American jazz with the traditional rhythms and tonal colors in the percussion of that continent. The album features compositions by African and American musicians, all based on aspects of West African (especially Nigerian) music.

Track listing
"Prayer by Solomon G. Ilori" - 0:55
"Ife L'ayo (There Is Happiness in Love)" (Solomon G. Ilori) - 5:31
"Obirin African (Woman of Africa)" (Garvin Masseaux) - 3:45
"Love, The Mystery of" (Guy Warren) - 9:22
"Ero Ti Nr'Ojeje" (Ilori) - 7:33
"Ayiko, Ayiko (Welcome, Welcome, My Darling)" (Ilori) - 7:13
"Tobi Ilu" (James H. Bey) - 5:56

Personnel
 Art Blakey — drums, timpani, telegraph drum, gong
 Ahmed Abdul-Malik — bass
 Yusef Lateef — cow horn, flute, tenor saxophone, mbira, oboe
 Curtis Fuller — timpani
 Chief Bey — double gong, conga, telegraph drum
 Robert Crowder — Batá drum, conga
 James Ola. Folami — conga
 Solomon G. Ilori — vocals, talking drum, pennywhistle
 Montego Joe — corboro drum, log drum, bambara drum, double gong
 Garvin Masseaux — shekere, African maracas, conga

References

1962 albums
Art Blakey albums
Blue Note Records albums
Albums produced by Alfred Lion